Thinkorswim by TD Ameritrade (often stylized and officially branded as thinkorswim, lacking capitalization) is an electronic trading platform by TD Ameritrade used to trade financial assets. It is geared for self-directed stock, options and futures traders. It was previously offered by ThinkorSwim Group, Inc., which was purchased by TD Ameritrade in 2009.

TD Ameritrade provides services for self-directed option traders and institutional users who invest in equities, exchange-traded funds, futures, mutual funds and bonds.

Thinkorswim provides financial literacy services for self-directed investors including trading tools and analytics. It offers a range of investor education products in a variety of interactive delivery formats, including instructor-led synchronous and asynchronous online courses, in-person workshops, one-on-one and one-to-many online coaching programs and telephone, live-chat and email support. Thinkorswim is used in conjunction with trades of equity securities, fixed income, index products, options, futures, other derivatives and foreign exchange. The Thinkorswim software is provided free for account holders of TD Ameritrade and trades via the TD Ameritrade platform are free.

thinkScript

thinkScript is included in thinkorswim. thinkScript allows you to use a simple coding language to develop your own tools for creating custom graphical data. As changes are made to a row of the program code, the live set of curves is instantly updated.

thinkScript function is similar to functions in programming languages. After you type the letters of a thinkScript function word, a small yellow "pop-down" selection box appears. Sometimes it helps to select (confirm) the function in "drop-down" selection box. Otherwise, sometimes, the typing can appear as plain text, instead of the white or green code text that indicates a thinkScript function. There is extensive live, row by row, code error format checking. When errors are present, the study name label header changes to red. A listing of errors by rows (and columns beside the row #) appears at the bottom of the screen.,

See Also: Representational state transfer, eSignal

History
Thinkorswim, Inc., was formed through multiple company mergers and acquisitions:

 In 1982, Telescan, a provider of stock charting and screening tools, was founded by Richard Carlin in Houston, Texas.
 In 1997, Online Investors Advantage, an investor education company, was founded.
 In 1999, Thinkorswim, Inc., was founded as an online brokerage specializing in options by Tom Sosnoff and Scott Sheridan
 In 2000, an international investor education company, ZiaSun, acquired Online Investors Advantage.
 In 2000, Lee Barba started as CEO with Telescan.
 On December 6, 2001, ZiaSun merged with Telescan to form Investools.
 In January 2005, Investools acquired Prophet Financial Systems, Inc., for $7.9 million in cash. Prophet's founder, Tim Knight, was made the Senior Vice President of Technology. In May 2005, Investools common stock was listed on NASDAQ in May 2006 and added to the Russell 3000, 2000 and Microcap indexes on June 30.
 In February 2007, Investools company completed the merger with Thinkorswim and its ticker symbol was changed to SWIM. In June 2008, the group adopted the name of its brokerage subsidiary, Thinkorswim, for its corporate identity, changing the listed holding company's name from Investools, Inc., to Thinkorswim Group Inc. At the time of the transaction, Thinkorswim had been a portfolio investment of Technology Crossover Ventures.
 In May 2008, the company announced that it was cooperating with an informal U.S. Securities and Exchange Commission investigation into presentations used during sales meetings.
 In January 2009, TD Ameritrade Holdings, Inc., acquired Thinkorswim Group, Inc., (including its INVESTools division) in a cash and stock deal valued around $606 million.
 In October 2022, Charles Schwab acquired TD Ameritrade Holdings, Inc., along with Thinkorswim Trading Platform., in a deal valued at approximately $26 billion.
 In January 2023, Charles Schwab announced that Thinkorswim will be available at Schwab later this year. Since then, the platform has undergone a number of upgrades with a focus on backend integration to support Schwab clients.

S.E.C. investigation & penalties
On December 10, 2009, the U.S. Securities and Exchange Commission began an investigation into Investools' (purchased by thinkorswim) use of misleading sales practices in which two named defendants, Michael J. Drew ("Drew") and Eben D. Miller ("Miller"), were giving trading workshops under the guise of being full-time investors by trade, having made their fortunes in this manner as well as assuring students they would achieve the same results by following the Investools method. Among the allegations by the S.E.C. was that "Investools Did Not Prevent its Speakers from Misleading Investors about a Survey of its Customers' Trading Success."

References

External links 
 
 https://www.sec.gov/litigation/litreleases/2009/lr21331.htm "S.E.C. Litigation Release No. 21331 Re: Investools"

Toronto-Dominion Bank
American companies established in 1999
Financial services companies established in 1999
Electronic trading platforms
Online brokerages
Financial derivative trading companies
2009 mergers and acquisitions
2006 initial public offerings
Companies formerly listed on the Nasdaq